Christopher Roscoe Lawless (born 4 November 1995) is a British cyclist, currently rides for UCI ProTeam .

Career
He achieved his first victory for the team in March, at the Settimana Internazionale di Coppi e Bartali.

Major results

2013
 1st  Road race, National Junior Road Championships
 1st  Points race, National Junior Track Championships
 3rd Omnium, National Track Championships
 9th Overall Trofeo Karlsberg
1st  Points classification
1st Stage 2
2014
 1st  Team pursuit, National Track Championships
 1st Six Days of Ghent Future Stars (with Matt Gibson)
2015
 6th Grand Prix Pino Cerami
2016
 1st Stage 1 New Zealand Cycle Classic
 2nd Road race, National Under-23 Road Championships
 3rd Rutland–Melton CiCLE Classic
 6th Trofej Umag
 10th Beaumont Trophy
2017
 National Road Championships
1st  Under-23 road race
2nd Road race
 1st ZLM Tour
 1st Stage 3b Tour de Beauce
 1st Stage 4 Tour de l'Avenir
 3rd Velothon Wales
 6th Overall Le Triptyque des Monts et Châteaux
2018
 Settimana Internazionale di Coppi e Bartali
1st  Points classification
1st Stages 1b (TTT) & 3
 3rd Scheldeprijs
2019
 1st  Overall Tour de Yorkshire
1st  Points classification
 3rd Scheldeprijs
 4th Overall Tour de Wallonie
1st  Young rider classification
2022
 2nd Schaal Sels
 3rd Clàssica Comunitat Valenciana 1969
 4th Grote Prijs Marcel Kint

Criterium

2015
 1st Barrow, Tour Series
 1st GP of Wales
 1st Stockton Festival of Cycling
 1st Tickhill
 2nd London Nocturne
2016
 1st  National Criterium Championships
 Tour Series
1st Ramsey
1st Stoke-on-Trent
 1st London Nocturne
 1st Otley Grand Prix
 1st Leicester Kermesse Castle Classic
 1st Beverley
 1st Sheffield
2017
 1st Otley Grand Prix
 1st Shrewsbury Grand Prix
 1st Wales Open

References

External links

Strava Profile

1995 births
Living people
British male cyclists
English male cyclists
Sportspeople from Wigan